The Magic Mountain is a novel by Thomas Mann, first published in German in November 1924. It is widely considered to be one of the most influential works of twentieth-century German literature.

Mann started writing The Magic Mountain in 1912. It began as a much shorter narrative that comically revisited the aspects of Death in Venice, a novella that he was preparing for publication. The newer work reflected his experiences and impressions during a period when his wife, who was suffering from a lung complaint, resided at Dr. Friedrich Jessen's Waldsanatorium in Davos, Switzerland for several months. In May and June 1912, Mann visited her and became acquainted with the team of doctors and patients in this cosmopolitan institution. According to Mann, in the afterword that was later included in the English translation of his novel, this stay inspired his opening chapter ("Arrival").

The outbreak of World War I interrupted his work on the book. The savage conflict and its aftermath led the author to undertake a major re-examination of European bourgeois society. He explored the sources of the destructiveness displayed by much of civilised humanity. He was also drawn to speculate about more general questions related to personal attitudes to life, health, illness, sexuality, and mortality. His political stance also changed during this period, from opposing the Weimar Republic to supporting it. Given this, Mann felt compelled to radically revise and expand the pre-war text before completing it in 1924. Der Zauberberg was eventually published in two volumes by S. Fischer Verlag in Berlin.

Mann's vast composition is erudite, subtle, ambitious, but, most of all, ambiguous; since its original publication it has been subject to a variety of critical assessments. For example, the book blends a scrupulous realism with deeper symbolic undertones. Given this complexity, each reader is obliged to interpret the significance of the pattern of events in the narrative, a task made more difficult by the author's irony. Mann was well aware of his book's elusiveness, but offered few clues about approaches to the text. He later compared it to a symphonic work orchestrated with a number of themes. In a playful commentary on the problems of interpretation—"The Making of The Magic Mountain," written 25 years after the novel's original publication—he recommended that those who wished to understand it should read it twice.

Plot summary

The narrative opens in the decade before World War I. It introduces the protagonist, Hans Castorp, the only child of a Hamburg merchant family. Following the early death of his parents, Castorp has been brought up by his grandfather and, later, by a maternal uncle named James Tienappel. Castorp is in his early 20s, about to take up a shipbuilding career in Hamburg, his hometown. Before beginning work, he undertakes a journey to visit his tubercular cousin, Joachim Ziemssen, who is seeking a cure in a sanatorium in Davos, high up in the Swiss Alps. In the opening chapter, Castorp leaves his familiar life and obligations, in what he later learns to call "the flatlands", to visit the rarefied mountain air and introspective small world of the sanatorium.

Castorp's departure from the sanatorium is repeatedly delayed by his failing health. What at first appears to be a minor bronchial infection with slight fever is diagnosed by the sanatorium's chief doctor and director, Hofrat Behrens, as symptoms of tuberculosis. Castorp is persuaded by Behrens to stay until his health improves.

During his extended stay, Castorp meets a variety of characters, who represent a microcosm of pre-war Europe. These include Lodovico Settembrini (an Italian humanist and encyclopedist, a student of Giosuè Carducci); Leo Naphta, a Jewish Jesuit who favors communistic totalitarianism; Mynheer Peeperkorn, a dionysian Dutchman; and his romantic interest, Madame Clawdia Chauchat.

Castorp eventually resides at the sanatorium for seven years. As the novel concludes, the war begins, and Castorp volunteers for the military. His possible demise upon the battlefield is portended.

Literary significance and criticism
The Magic Mountain can be read both as a classic example of the European Bildungsroman – a "novel of education" or "novel of formation" – and as a sly parody of this genre. Many formal elements of this type of fiction are present: like the protagonist of a typical Bildungsroman, the immature Castorp leaves his home and learns about art, culture, politics, human frailty, and love. Also embedded within this vast novel are extended reflections on the experience of time, music, nationalism, sociological issues, and changes in the natural world. Castorp's stay in the rarefied air of The Magic Mountain provides him with a panoramic view of pre-war European civilization and its discontents.

Mann describes the subjective experience of serious illness and the gradual process of medical institutionalization. He also alludes to the irrational forces within the human psyche, at a time when Freudian psychoanalysis was becoming a prominent type of treatment. These themes relate to the development of Castorp's character over the time span covered by the novel. In his discussion of the work, written in English and published in The Atlantic January 1953, Mann states that "what [Hans] came to understand is that one must go through the deep experience of sickness and death to arrive at a higher sanity and health...."

Mann acknowledged his debt to the skeptical insights of Friedrich Nietzsche concerning modern humanity, and he drew from these in creating conversations between the characters. Throughout the book the author employs the discussions among Settembrini, Naphta, and the medical staff to introduce the young Castorp to a wide spectrum of competing ideologies about responses to the Age of Enlightenment. However, whereas the classical Bildungsroman would conclude by Castorp's having become a mature member of society, with his own world-view and greater self-knowledge, The Magic Mountain ends with Castorp's becoming an anonymous conscript, one of millions, under fire on some battlefield of World War I.

Major themes

Connection to Death in Venice
Mann wrote that he originally planned The Magic Mountain as a novella, a humorous, ironic, satirical (and satyric) follow-up to Death in Venice, which he had completed in 1912. The atmosphere was to derive from the "mixture of death and amusement" that Mann had encountered while visiting his wife in a Swiss sanatorium. He intended to transfer to a comedic plane the fascination with death and triumph of ecstatic disorder over a life devoted to order, which he had explored in Death in Venice.

The Magic Mountain contains many contrasts and parallels with the earlier novel. Gustav von Aschenbach, an established author, is matched to a young, callow engineer at the start of a regular career. The erotic allure of the beautiful Polish boy Tadzio corresponds to the Asiatic-flabby ("asiatisch-schlaff") Russian Madame Chauchat. The setting was shifted both geographically and symbolically. The lowlands of the Italian coastlands are contrasted to an alpine resort famed for its health-giving properties.

Illness and death
The Berghof patients suffer from some form of tuberculosis, which rules their daily routines, thoughts, and conversations of the "Half lung club." The disease ends fatally for many of the patients, such as the Catholic girl Barbara Hujus, whose fear of death is heightened in a harrowing Viaticum scene,  and cousin Ziemssen, who leaves this world like an ancient hero. The dialogues between Settembrini and Naphta examine life and death from a metaphysical perspective. Besides the deaths from fatal illness, two characters commit suicide, and finally Castorp goes off to fight in World War I, and it is implied that he will be killed on the battlefield.

In the above-mentioned comment Mann writes:

What Castorp learns to fathom is that all higher health must have passed through illness and death.... As Hans Castorp once says to Madame Chauchat, there are two ways to life: One is the common, direct, and brave. The other is bad, leading through death, and that is the genius way. This concept of illness and death, as a necessary passage to knowledge, health, and life, makes The Magic Mountain into a novel of initiation.

Time
Closely connected to the themes of life and death is the subjective nature of time, a leitmotif that recurs throughout the book—here the influence of Henri Bergson is evident. Thus Chapter VII, entitled "By the Ocean of Time", opens with the narrator asking rhetorically, "Can one tell – that is to say, narrate – time, time itself, as such, for its own sake?" Mann's authorial (and ironic) response to the question posed is, "That would surely be an absurd undertaking..." He compares storytelling with the act of musicmaking, describing them as being alike in that they can " ...only present themselves as a flowing, as a succession in time, as one thing after another..." .

The Magic Mountain, in essence, embodies the author's meditations on the tempo of experience.

The narrative is ordered chronologically but accelerates throughout the novel, so that the first five chapters (approximately half of the text) relate the first of Castorp's seven years at the sanatorium in great detail; the remaining six years, marked by monotony and routine, are described in the last two chapters. This asymmetry corresponds to Castorp's own skewed perception of the passage of time.

This structure reflects the protagonists’ thoughts. Throughout the book, they discuss the philosophy of time and debate whether "interest and novelty dispel or shorten the content of time, while monotony and emptiness hinder its passage".  The characters also reflect on the problems of narration and time,  about the correspondence between the length of a narrative and the duration of the events it describes.

Mann also meditates upon the interrelationship between the experience of time and space; of time seeming to pass more slowly when one doesn't move in space. This aspect of the novel mirrors contemporary philosophical and scientific debates which are embodied in Heidegger's writings and Albert Einstein's theory of relativity, in which space and time are inseparable. In essence, Castorp's subtly transformed perspective on the "flat-lands" corresponds to a movement in time.

Magic and mountains

The titular reference to mountain reappears in many layers. The Berghof sanatorium is located on a mountain, both geographically and figuratively, a separate world. The mountain also represents the opposite of Castorp's home, the sober, businesslike "flatland".

The first part of the novel culminates and ends in the sanatorium's Carnival feast. There, in a grotesque scene named after Walpurgis Night, the setting is transformed into the Blocksberg, where according to German tradition, witches and wizards meet in obscene revelry. This is also described in Goethe's Faust I. At this event, Castorp woos Madame Chauchat; their subtle conversation is carried on almost wholly in French.

Another topos of German literature is the Venus Mountain (Venusberg), which is referred to in Richard Wagner's opera Tannhäuser. This mountain is a "hellish paradise", a place of lust and abandon, where Time flows differently: the visitor loses all sense of time. Castorp, who planned to stay at the sanatorium for three weeks, does not leave the Berghof for seven years.

In general, the inhabitants of the Berghof spend their days in a mythical, distant atmosphere. The X-ray laboratory in the cellar represents the Hades of Greek mythology, where Medical Director Behrens acts as the judge and punisher Rhadamanthys and where Castorp is a fleeting visitor, like Odysseus. Behrens compares the cousins to Castor and Pollux; Settembrini compares himself to Prometheus. Frau Stöhr mentions Sisyphus and Tantalus, albeit confusedly.

The culmination of the second part of the novel is perhaps the – still "episodic" – chapter of Castorp's blizzard dream (in the novel simply called "Snow"). The protagonist gets into a sudden blizzard, beginning a death-bound sleep, dreaming at first of beautiful meadows with blossoms and of lovable young people at a southern seaside; then of a scene reminiscent of a grotesque event in Goethe's Faust I ("the witches' kitchen", again in Goethe's "Blocksberg chapter"); and finally ending with a dream of extreme cruelty – the slaughtering of a child by two witches, priests of a classic temple. According to Mann, this represents the original and deathly destructive force of nature itself.

Castorp awakens in due time, escapes from the blizzard, and returns to the "Berghof". But rethinking his dreams, he concludes that "because of charity and love, man should never allow death to rule one's thoughts". Castorp soon forgets this sentence, so for him the blizzard event remains an interlude. This is the only sentence in the novel that Mann highlighted by italics.

There are frequent references to Grimms' Fairy Tales, based on European myths. The opulent meals are compared to the magically self-laying table of "Table, Donkey, and Stick"; Frau Engelhardt's quest to learn the first name of Madame Chauchat mirrors that of the queen in "Rumpelstiltskin". Castorp's given name is the same as "Clever Hans". Although the ending is not explicit, it is possible that Castorp dies on the battlefield. Mann leaves his fate unresolved.

Mann makes use of the number seven, often believed to have magical qualities: Castorp was seven when his parents died; he stays seven years at the Berghof; the central Walpurgis Night scene happens after seven months, both cousins have seven letters in their last name, the dining hall has seven tables, the digits of Castorp's room number (34) add up to seven, and Joachim's room is a multiple of seven (28=7×4). Settembrini's name includes seven (sette) in Italian, Joachim keeps a thermometer in his mouth for seven minutes, and Mynheer Peeperkorn announces his suicide in a group of seven. Joachim decides to leave after a stay of seven times seventy days, and dies at seven o'clock. The novel itself, moreover, is divided into seven chapters.

Music
Hans Castorp loved music from his heart; it worked upon him much the same way as did his breakfast porter, with deeply soothing, narcotic effect, tempting him to doze.

There is something suspicious about music, gentlemen. I insist that she is, by her nature, equivocal. I shall not be going too far in saying at once that she is politically suspect. (Herr Settembrini, ch. 4)

Mann gives a central role to music in this novel. People at the Berghof listen to "Der Lindenbaum" from the Winterreise played on a gramophone. This piece is full of mourning in the view of death and hints of an invitation to suicide. In the book's final scene, Castorp, now an ordinary soldier on Germany's western front in World War I, hums the song to himself as his unit advances in battle.

Allegorical characters
Mann uses the novel's main characters to introduce Castorp to the ideas and ideologies of his time. The author observed that the characters are all "exponents, representatives, and messengers of intellectual districts, principles, and worlds," hoping that he had not made them mere wandering allegories.

Castorp

According to the author, the protagonist is a questing knight, the "pure fool" looking for the Holy Grail in the tradition of Parzival. However, he remains pale and mediocre, representing a German bourgeois that is torn between conflicting influences – capable of the highest humanistic ideals, yet at the same time prone to both stubborn philistinism and radical ideologies. As usual, Mann chooses his protagonist's name carefully: Hans is a generic German first name, almost anonymous, but also refers to the fairy tale figure of Hans im Glück and the apostle St. John (Johannes in German), the favourite disciple of Jesus, who beholds the Revelation (Offenbarung des Johannes in German). Castorp is the name of a historically prominent family in Mann's hometown, Lübeck, which provided at least three generations of Mayors for the town in the era of the Renaissance. The "torp" is Danish, not unexpected on the German north coast. Castorp also refers to the twins Castor and Pollux in Greek mythology, who were identified by the New Testament scholar Dennis MacDonald as models for the apostles James and John.

In a way, Hans Castorp can be seen as the incorporation of the young Weimar Republic: Both humanism and radicalism, represented by Settembrini and Naphta, try to win his favour, but Castorp is unable to decide. Furthermore, the outside temperature in Castorp's residence is out of balance: it is either too warm or too cold and tends to extremes (e.g. snow in August), but never normal. According to Christian Kracht, "Hans Castorp experienced the elevation of his temperature as lifting him to an elevated state of being."

The most pronounced instances of Thomas Mann's political conversion is in the "Schnee" chapter. Completed in June 1923, this chapter, which forms the philosophical heart of the novel, attempts to overcome apparent contrasts and find a compromise between Naphta's and Settembrini's positions. In the chapter "Humaniora", written in 1920, Castorp tells Behrens, in a discussion on medical matters, that an interest in life means an interest in death. In the "Schnee" chapter, Castorp comes to exactly the opposite conclusion. The basis for Castorp's contradiction can be found in the speech Von deutscher Republik, written in the previous year, in which Mann outlines his position with regards to precedence of life and humanity over death. Even though Castorp could not possibly have learnt from either Naphta or Settembrini the idea that the experience of death is ultimately that of life and leads to a new appreciation of humanity, Mann was determined from at least September 1922 onwards to make this message the main point of his novel. In a letter of 4 September 1922 to Arthur Schnitzler, Mann refers to Von deutscher Republik, in which, he says, he is endeavouring to win the German middle classes over to the cause of the Republic and humanitarian concerns, and adds that his new-found passion for humanitarianism is closely related to the novel on which he is working. In the climax of the "Schnee" chapter, Castorp's vision is of the triumph of life, love and human concern over sickness and death. This realisation corresponds closely to Mann's key observation in Von deutscher Republik. As if to dispel any lingering doubts, Mann makes the meaning absolutely clear in his Tischrede in Amsterdam, held on 3 May 1924. Death stands for the ultra-conservative opponents of the Republic, while life embodies the supporters of democracy, the only way to guarantee a humanitarian future. The Schnee chapter was written in the first half of 1923 and the italicisation of the key sentence was probably requested by Mann when the book was set in print in 1924, as a message to the readers of the time, who, after years of hyper-inflation and political turmoil, not only expected but also desperately needed a positive direction to their lives, some words of wisdom which would give them hope.

Settembrini: Humanism

Settembrini represents the active and positive ideal of the Enlightenment, of Humanism, democracy, tolerance and human rights. He often finds Castorp literally in the dark and switches on the light before their conversations. He compares himself to Prometheus of Greek mythology, who brought fire and enlightenment to Man. His own mentor Giosuè Carducci has even written a hymn to another lightbringer: Lucifer, "la forza vindice della ragione."  His ethics are based on bourgeois values and labor. He tries to counter Castorp's morbid fascination with death and disease, warns him against the ill Madame Chauchat, and tries to demonstrate a positive outlook on life.

His antagonist Naphta describes him as "Zivilisationsliterat", meaning cosmopolitan, un-German intellectuals. Mann originally constructed Settembrini as a caricature of the liberal-democratic novelist represented, for example, by his own brother Heinrich Mann. However, while the novel was being written, Mann himself became an outspoken supporter of the Weimar Republic, precipitated by the assassination of then German Foreign Minister Walther Rathenau whom Mann deeply admired, which may explain why Settembrini, especially in the later chapters, becomes the "Sprachrohr des Autoren"; - the voice of the author.

Settembrini's physical characteristics are reminiscent of the Italian composer Ruggiero Leoncavallo.

Naphta: Radicalism

Settembrini's antagonist Naphta was Jewish, but joined the Jesuits and became a Hegelian Marxist. The character was a parody of the philosopher Georg Lukács, who "plainly has not recognized himself in Naphta", wrote Mann in a 1949 letter.

Even here a change in Mann's political stance can be seen. In "Operationes spirituales", written towards the end of 1922, Naphta is termed a "revolutionary" and "socialist", but Settembrini sees Naphta's fantasies as emanating from an anti-humanitarian reactionary revolution ("Revolution des antihumanen Rückschlages"). In this chapter, the terrorism championed by Naphta is no longer, in Castorp's eyes, associated solely with the "Diktatur des Proletariats", but also with conservative Prussian militarism and Jesuitism. The association here between Naphta's advocacy of terrorism and two extremely conservative movements—Prussian militarism and Jesuitism—is a huge political shift for the novel. Terrorism, up till now exclusively the province of the communist revolution, is now suddenly also an instrument of reactionary conservatism. In a clear allusion on Mann's part to the assassination of Walther Rathenau, Naphta goes into the motivation of the revolutionary who killed Councillor of State August von Kotzebue in 1819 and concludes that it was not just the desire for freedom at stake here but also moral fanaticism and political outrage. That this is a direct reference to the death of Rathenau is borne out by the fact that in the first edition Mann refers to the shooting of Kotzebue, whereas he was in fact stabbed. Alerted to this mistake by Max Rieger, Mann replied on 1 September 1925 that he would rectify the error at the first opportunity. Mann changed the word "geschossen" to "erstochen" for future editions. For the 1924 readership, however, the association with Rathenau could not have been clearer.

Chauchat: Love and temptation
Clawdia Chauchat represents erotic temptation, lust, and love, all in a degenerate, morbid, "Asiatic-flabby" form.  She is one of the major reasons for Castorp's extended stay on the magic mountain. The female promise of sensual pleasure as hindrance to male zest for action  imitates the themes from the Circe mythos and in the nymphs in Wagner's Venus Mountain. Chauchat's feline characteristics are noted often, her last name is derived from the French chaud chat (Eng., hot cat), and her first name includes the English claw. (Her name may also be a reference to the Chauchat machine gun,
a French weapon that saw significant use by the French and American forces during World War I.)  ChaudChat could also be a play on words with Chaud (hot) and Chatte (female genitalia) in French slang.

Clawdia Chauchat leaves the Berghof for some time, but she returns with an impressive companion, Mynheer Peeperkorn, who suffers from a tropical disease.

Peeperkorn: The Dionysian principle

Mynheer Peeperkorn, Clawdia Chauchat's new lover, enters the Berghof scenery late, but he is one of the most commanding persons of the novel. His behavior and personality, with its flavour of importance, combined with obvious awkwardness and the strange inability ever to complete a statement, is reminiscent of certain figures in former novellas of the author (e.g. Herr Klöterjahn in Tristan) – figures, which are, on the one hand, admired because of their vital energy, and, on the other hand, condemned because of their naïveté. In total, this person represents the grotesqueness of a Dionysian character. The Greek god Dionysus is also important in Nietzschean philosophy, whose The Birth of Tragedy is the source of the title The Magic Mountain.

Peeperkorn ends his life by suicide, also performed in a strange manner.

Mynheer Peeperkorn is used by the author to personify his rival, the influential German poet Gerhart Hauptmann, and even certain properties of Goethe (with whom Hauptmann often was compared).

Ziemssen: Duty
Joachim Ziemssen, Hans Castorp's cousin, is described as a young person representing the ideals of loyalty and faithfulness as an officer. As already mentioned, Dr. Behrens alludes to the pair as "Castor(p) and Pollux", the twin brothers of the Greek mythology. And in fact, there is some affinity between the two cousins, both in their love to Russian women (Clawdia Chauchat in the case of Hans Castorp, the female co-patient "Marusja" in the case of Joachim Ziemssen), and also in their ideals. But, in contrast to Hans Castorp, who is an assertive person on the Berghof scene, Joachim Ziemssen is rather shy, known to stand somehow outside of the community. He tries to escape from what he, unspokenly, feels to be a morbid atmosphere. After long discussions with his cousin, and in spite of being warned by Dr. Behrens, he returns to the "flatlands", where he fulfills his military duties for some time. But after a while, forced by deterioration of his lungs, he returns to the Berghof. It is, however, too late for a successful treatment of his illness, and he dies in the sanitarium. His death is described in a moving chapter of the novel, with the title "As a soldier, and a good one" ["(Ich sterbe) als Soldat und brav"], again a well-known citation from Goethe's Faust.

In popular culture
The Magic Mountain is mentioned in the film The Wind Rises (2013), directed by Hayao Miyazaki, by a German character named Hans Castorp.

In literature, it is mentioned in the novel Norwegian Wood written by Haruki Murakami, and some of its characters appear in Tintin in the New World by Frederic Tuten. Mention is also made in the nonfiction text The Death of the Banker: The Decline and Fall of the Great Financial Dynasties and the Triumph of the Small Investor, by Ron Chernow.

The novel is mentioned in The Dick Van Dyke Show episode "That's My Boy??" (season 3, episode 1). With all the mix-ups at the hospital between the Petries and the Peters, and each getting the other's stuff, Rob is trying to determine if he and Laura brought home the right baby, so he goes to check the baby's footprints, which he tells his neighbor are kept in The Magic Mountain. "Huh?" says Jerry. "The book", says Rob. Jerry finds the footprints and reads the book's title, "Oh, Thomas Mann", and then they cover the kid's foot with blue ink.

The 2016 psychological horror film A Cure for Wellness was inspired by Mann's novel.

In 2017, Father John Misty released Pure Comedy along with the song "So I'm Growing Old on Magic Mountain". The song is comparable to the book, because the artist wanted to emphasize his change and his will to move on with his life, accepting his mortality.

Movies
 Der Zauberberg, a German black-and-white TV production in 1968 by Sender Freies Berlin.
 The Magic Mountain (1982 film)

Notes

References

Further reading

Translations into English 
 The Magic Mountain, translated into English by H. T. Lowe-Porter with an afterword by the author, 1927, Secker and Warburg, SBN 436-27237-2
 The Magic Mountain, a new translation into English by John E. Woods, 1996, . This won the Helen and Kurt Wolff Translator's Prize in 1996.

Literary criticism
 Dowden, Stephen (2002) A Companion to Thomas Mann's Magic Mountain, Camden House, 
 Bloom, Harold, ed. (1986) The Magic Mountain: Modern Critical Interpretations, Chelsea House, 
 Heller, Erich (1958) The Ironic German: A Study of Thomas Mann, Boston and Toronto, Little, Brown and Co.
 
 Jesi, Furio (1979), "Venusberg – Hexenberg – Zauberberg", in Materiali mitologici. Mito e antropologia nella cultura mitteleuropea, Einaudi, Torino 2001 (pp. 224–52)
 Lukács, Georg (1965) Essays on Thomas Mann, Translated by Stanley Mitchell, New York, Grosset and Dunlap
 Nehamas, Alexander (1998) The Art of Living: Socratic Reflections from Plato to Foucault, University of California Press
 Reed, T. J. (1974) Thomas Mann: The Uses of Tradition, Oxford University Press
 Robertson, Ritchie (2001) The Cambridge Companion to Thomas Mann (Cambridge Companions to Literature Series), Cambridge University Press
 Sontag, Susan (1978) Illness as Metaphor, Farrar, Straus and Giroux
 Travers, Martin (1992) Thomas Mann, Modern Novelists Series, Macmillan
 Weigand, Hermann J. (1971) Thomas Mann's Novel Der Zauberberg: A Study, New York, AMS Press

External links
 A review of the novel from a medical perspective (Retrieved via the Internet Archive.)
 A study guide for the novel (Retrieved via the Internet Archive.)
 The 'Zauberberg' in Davos still exists (The sanatorium was converted into a hotel in 1954.)

1924 German-language novels
S. Fischer Verlag books
German bildungsromans
German novels adapted into films
German philosophical novels
Modernist novels
Novels by Thomas Mann
Novels set in Hamburg
Novels set in Switzerland
Davos in fiction
Tuberculosis in fiction